Philip Medows (1708-1781) was deputy ranger of Richmond Park.

He was the third son of Philip Meadowes and Dorothy, sister of Hugh Boscawen, 1st Viscount Falmouth. In 1734 he married Frances, only daughter of William Pierrepoint, Viscount Newark. They had two sons:
Charles Pierrepoint, 1st Earl Manvers 
Sir William Medows

References

1708 births
1781 deaths